Al Ghurair (Arabic: الغرير), also known as Al Ghurair Investment LLC, was established in 1960. Al Ghurair is one of the largest diversified family business groups in the Middle East, with six key business units: Foods, Resources, Properties, Construction, Energy and Ventures, including Auto Servicing & Trading, Retail and Education (Al Ghurair University).

Foods
Al Ghurair Foods was established in 1976 through the creation of National Flour Mills. The entity focuses on a diversified portfolio of food products. In 2011 Al Ghurair Foods had a market presence in 20 countries over 4 continents.  Jenan is Al Ghurair Foods' principal brand offering products that include flour, pasta, edible oils, animal nutrition, fibers & livestock feeds, mono-gastric feeds and premixes. In 2010 plans were announced to open a new factory in Jebel Ali, Dubai to explore export opportunities primarily in Indonesia and Japan.

Agricultural raw material (resources)
Al Ghurair Resources provides manufacturers and traders in the Food and Biofuel industries with their agricultural raw material requirement such as:
 Grain – wheat, maize, rice, pulses, and barley
 Protein – soybean meal, canola meal and soybean hulls
 Oil – crude and refined canola oil, soya bean oil, sunflower oil, corn oil and refined palm oils
 Pulses – Bulk Pulses (Yellow Chick Peas Split, Red Lentils) & Packed Pulses (Red Lentils, Red Kidney Beans, White Kidney Beans & Chick Peas Split)
 Fiber – bran, oaten hay, and alfalfa.

Construction
Al Ghurair Construction was founded in the 60's and focuses on aluminium, foundations, masonry and readymix. Projects associated with this entity include Burj Khalifa, Fairmont Hotel, Emirates Towers, BurJuman, Dubai Metro, Etisalat, Kempinski Hotel and Dubai Roads and Transport Authority.

Properties
Al Ghurair Properties focuses on mixed use, commercial, hospitality and residential real estate projects. Al Ghurair Centre, a development consisting of shopping, residential and commercial markets is a project associated with the group. The commercial properties division focuses on offices, warehouse and factory facilities. Retail Initiative develops and manages retail properties and the hospitality portfolio, including both hotel and apartment properties.

Energy
Al Ghurair's Energy initiative is a partnership between TRASTA Energy and Libyan National Oil Corp (LNOC). Al Ghurair reportedly has a share ownership of 220,000 bpd and the initiative has been operating at the Ras Lanuff Refinery since January 2008 under the name Libyan Emirates Oil Refining Co. (LERCO). The focus is on refined products of kerosene, naphtha, gas oil and fuel oil. It is reported that plans are in place to further build another refinery in the region along with the full establishment of a marketing and trading entity, though this is yet to be confirmed.

Mobility
Al Ghurair Investment runs Cars Taxi business, which is one of taxi operators in Dubai. Badr Al Ghurair is the Chief Executive Officer of Al Ghurair CarsTaxi. In his role, Badr oversees the ongoing operations of all divisions. CarsTaxi was the first taxi company in the UAE to incorporate hybrid taxis into their fleet. Badr Al Ghurair is the son of Abdulla bin Ahmad Al Ghurair, the founder and chairman of Mashreqbank, an Emirati bank

Printing & Publishing
Al Ghurair Printing & Publishing was established in 1978 and focuses on printing and publishing. The services include designing, prepress, production, binding & finishing, quality control and logistics.

Retail
Al Ghurair Retail LLC operates 60 stores in 3 countries for the brands Springfield and THEFACESHOP.  The retail distribution and warehousing facility is located in Dubai.

Education
Dar Al Marefa and Al Ghurair University are educational institutions associated with the group. Dar Al Marefa is a school based in Dubai. The school provides a bilingual curriculum with the syllabi covering social, physical and academic development. Al Ghurair University (AGU), based in Dubai, is a private higher educational institution that focuses on accredited bachelor degree programmes for students.

References

Conglomerate companies of the United Arab Emirates
Companies based in Dubai
Investment companies of the United Arab Emirates